The American Academy of Neurology (AAN) is a professional society representing over 38,000 neurologists and neuroscientists. As a medical specialty society it was established in 1948 by A.B. Baker of the University of Minnesota to advance the art and science of neurology, and thereby promote the best possible care for patients with neurological disorders.  It is based in Minneapolis, Minnesota, with a health policy office in Washington, DC.

In April 2012, the academy relocated its headquarters to a new 63,000-square-foot building in downtown Minneapolis. The five-story facility cost $20 million to build.

Membership
The current classes of membership includes:
 Student – a medical student enrolled in an accredited medical/osteopathic school, or graduate students enrolled in a doctoral program.
 Intern – a graduate of an accredited medical/osteopathic school who is engaged in their first year of residency training and will be completing post-graduate training in neurology.
 Junior – a graduate of an accredited medical/osteopathic school who is completing training in a neurology residency program or a Ph.D. student completing post-doctoral research training.
 Advanced Care Practitioner – A non-physician practitioner (NP, PA, or RN) who devotes a majority of their time to the practice of neurology.
 Researcher – a professional who has dedicated his/her career to the advancement of neuroscience through research.
 Physician Affiliate – a physician in a specialty other than neurology or a professional practicing in a specialty related to neurology. This level of membership has both United States and International categories.
 Neurologist – a physician fully trained in neurology and board certified by the ABPN, AOBNP, the Royal College of Physicians and Surgeons of Canada or the Collège des médecins du Québec. This level of membership has both United States and International categories
 Fellow of the American Academy of Neurology (FAAN) – The highest and most respected class of membership is awarded to selected board-certified neurologists and research neuroscientists who have demonstrated high achievements in teaching, clinical practice, administration and/or research. Awarding of Fellowship status is based on a multi-step process involving nominations from current Fellows, a rigorous review of the nomination by the AAN Membership Application Review Subcommittee and endorsement of the AAN Executive Committee. Fellows carry the post-nominal title "FAAN" (not to be confused with "FAAN" status granted by the American Academy of Nursing). The Fellow status has both International and United States subcategories. Fellows practicing outside the United States or Canada are referred to as Corresponding Fellows.

Activities

Annual meeting
The annual meeting of the AAN is attended by more than 15,000 neurologists and neuroscientists from the US and abroad.
The American Academy of Neurology has formal policies for avoiding conflicts of interest with pharmaceutical and device industries, and meets or exceeds all recommendations of the Council of Medical Specialty Societies Code.

Top five Choosing Wisely recommendations
The AAN partnered with the  American Board of Internal Medicine Foundation and Consumer Reports to provide their top 5 recommendations for neurologists. Out of 178 nominations from AAN members, these 5 guidelines were selected by a panel of 4 AAN Staff and 10 experienced AAN members who voted according to a modified Delphi method. The guidelines were published in Neurology on February 20, 2013.

 Don't perform EEGs for headaches.
 Don't perform imaging of the carotid arteries for simple syncope without other neurologic symptoms.
 Don't use opioid or butalbital treatment for migraine except as a last resort.
 Don't prescribe interferon-beta or glatiramer acetate to patients with disability from progressive, non-relapsing forms of multiple sclerosis.
 Disrecommend for asymptomatic carotid stenosis unless the complication rate is low (<3%).

Publications 
AAN publishes the following publications:
 Neurology – the flagship journal of the American Academy of Neurology, features the latest peer-reviewed original clinical research articles, AAN position papers and clinical guidelines, editorials, and reviews that enhance the field of neurology and influence patient care. The online version contains complete content; the print version contains short data-filled summaries of the research articles. The Impact Factor of the journal is 12.258.
 Neurology Clinical Practice – focuses mainly on two aspects of neurologic care: 1) Clinical research on patient-reported outcomes and quality, including original research articles and meta-analyses/systematic reviews; and 2) Commentaries, reviews, and research articles on general practice, billing and coding, wellness and burnout, diversity and inclusion in the workplace, telehealth, health care policy, and financial management.
 Neurology Education – an online-only, open access journal in the field of neurologic and neuroscience education research. Original research articles, reviews, and editorials on evidence-based teaching methods and curriculum innovations aim to provide the academic community with a forum to exchange ideas that enhance teaching and training.
 Neurology Genetics – an online-only, open-access journal publishing peer-reviewed reports in the area of neurogenetics that elucidate the role of genetic and epigenetic variations in diseases and biological traits of the central and peripheral nervous systems. The journal’s Impact Factor is 3.663.
 Neurology Neuroimmunology & Neuroinflammation – an online-only, open-access journal with rigorously peer-reviewed reports of research in this area affecting the full range of neurologic diseases. Articles, editorials, and reviews aim to facilitate basic and translational research, along with enhancing patient care. The journal’s Impact Factor is 11.360.
 Continuum – an in-depth clinically oriented review journal for the practicing neurologist, residents and fellows, advanced practice providers, and neurology professionals. Written by authors who are experts in their field, each bimonthly issue contains up-to-date knowledge around a single topic area in neurology.
 Neurology Today – the AAN's official news source, reports on breaking news, issues, and trends in the practice and science of neurology. It delivers credible, up-to-the-minute, balanced, cutting-edge reporting and commentary for today's busy neurology professionals. Published in print twice a month, it also gives readers the inside track to key clinical and basic science advances.
 Brain & Life – a free magazine for patients and caregivers, focused on the intersection of neurologic disease and brain health. A subscription (six issues a year) is available to anyone residing in the United States interested in learning more about neurologic conditions and how to live well with them.
 [https://www.brainandlife.org/the-magazine/spanish/ Brain & Life en Español] – a magazine for Spanish-speaking readers, published quarterly, mailed to interested readers in the United States with all content available online.
 AANnews – the American Academy of Neurology’s monthly member magazine.

See also
 Potamkin Prize

References

External links 
 AAN website

Medical associations based in the United States
Neurology organizations
Medical and health organizations based in Minnesota
1948 establishments in Minnesota
Organizations established in 1948